WOW Essentials includes twelve songs on a single CD. It presents some of the best songs on the contemporary Christian music scene.  The album reached No. 13 on the Billboard Christian Albums chart in 2008.

Track listing

See also
 WOW Series

References 

WOW series albums
2008 compilation albums